Spring Creek is a stream in the U.S. state of Ohio. The  stream is a tributary of the Great Miami River.

Spring Creek was so named for the fact it is a spring-fed creek.

See also
List of rivers of Ohio

References

Rivers of Miami County, Ohio
Rivers of Shelby County, Ohio
Rivers of Ohio